The Prince of Egypt: Nashville was one of three albums produced alongside the release of DreamWorks's 1998 film, The Prince of Egypt. This country-themed album included songs written and inspired by the film, featuring prominent country acts.

It peaked at No. 6 and No. 8 on the Billboard Top Contemporary Christian and Top Country Albums charts, respectively.

Track listing
"Freedom", performed by Wynonna Judd – 4:40
"Make It Through", performed by Randy Travis and Linda Davis – 3:56
"I Give You to His Heart", performed by Alison Krauss – 4:30
"Heartbeat of Hope", performed by Steven Curtis Chapman – 4:44
"Milk and Honey", performed by Pam Tillis – 4:00
"Once in a While", performed by Vince Gill – 3:36
"Walk in Glory", performed by Mindy McCready – 4:07
"Somewhere Down the Road", performed by Faith Hill – 5:38
"Please Be the One", performed by Reba McEntire – 3:09
"Slavery, Deliverance and Faith", performed by Clint Black – 4:28
"Godspeed", performed by Beth Nielsen Chapman – 3:16
"The Voice", performed by Alabama – 4:21
"You Are My Light", performed by Gary Chapman – 4:48
"The Moving of the Mountain", performed by Mac McAnally – 3:44
"I Will Be There for You", performed by Jessica Andrews – 3:19
"I Can't Be a Slave", performed by Toby Keith – 3:21
"Could It Be Me", performed by Charlie Daniels – 5:08

Two singles entered the Hot Country Singles & Tracks chart: Judd's rendition of "Freedom" at No. 68, and Andrews' "I Will Be There for You" at No. 28. The latter also peaked at No. 8 on Billboard's Bubbling Under Hot 100 chart.

Charts

Weekly charts

Year-end charts

Certifications

References

1990s film soundtrack albums
1998 soundtrack albums
DreamWorks Records soundtracks
Country music soundtracks
The Prince of Egypt